Fenton Manor railway station was a station in the Fenton area of Stoke-on-Trent, opened in 1889 by the North Staffordshire Railway on its line to Leek. It was located on Victoria Road and was one of two stations in the area, the other being Fenton on the Stoke-Derby Line.

The station closed in 1956. The track is still in situ and the buildings still exist. The platform edges can still be traced.

Future 

The station lies on the proposed line to reopen from Stoke to Leekbrook Junction (Moorland City Railway).

References

Disused railway stations in Stoke-on-Trent
Railway stations in Great Britain closed in 1956
Railway stations in Great Britain opened in 1889
Former North Staffordshire Railway stations